The Gilcrease Expressway is a  highway in Tulsa County, Oklahoma, United States. It is part of the county's long-term plan to complete an outer highway loop around Tulsa's central business district. The highway will connect Interstate 44 (I-44) in West Tulsa to I-244 near the Tulsa International Airport.

Route description
Currently, the portion of freeway open to traffic is the section between North 41st West Avenue and Interstate 244. From US-75 to I-244/US-412, the Gilcrease carries the easternmost part of State Highway 11. The currently existing freeway serves Tulsa International Airport and surrounding areas.

Additionally, the Gilcrease Expressway Extension has been constructed. It is a  stretch of two-lane road signed as State Highway 344.  The extension currently runs from W. 51st St. to W. 41st St. South at the 5600 block in West Tulsa. The Extension connects the community of Berryhill and the newer developments along W. 41st St. South to Interstate 44.

Future
The next portion of the Gilcrease Expressway to be constructed is the segment between North 41st W Avenue and Edison Street in West Tulsa. Although, the section between 41st W Ave and Edison Street is named 31st Street N, 53rd West Avenue, Newton Street and 57th West Avenue.

Many homes have been removed along South 57th West Avenue between West 26th Street and West 21st Street. Plans include construction of a bridge over the Arkansas River, connecting Sand Springs and Berryhill.

$88 million of a $918.7 million tax increase will be put forward to the expressway's extension.

Proposed turnpike
In 2010, the Oklahoma Legislature authorized the Oklahoma Turnpike Authority to study the construction of a turnpike to complete the Gilcrease Expressway. The cost of the turnpike was estimated at $373 million for the final  of the expressway.

On October 29, 2015, Governor Mary Fallin announced Driving Forward, a $892 million turnpike package. A  tolled extension of the Gilcrease Expressway was included in the package. The project is scheduled to begin in the third quarter of 2016.

On June 4, 2018, the Oklahoma Transportation Commission approved the designation Oklahoma State Highway 344 for the highway, to take effect upon completion of construction. The extension opened on November 14, 2022.

Exit list
Mile markers reset between gap in route.

References

Roads in Oklahoma
Transportation in Tulsa, Oklahoma